Stabler may refer to:

People 
 Stabler (surname), an English and German surname, including notable people with the name

Places 
 Stabler, Washington, U.S., an unincorporated community
 Stabler Arena, a multipurpose venue in Bethlehem, Pennsylvania, U.S.
 Donald B. and Dorothy L. Stabler Health Sciences Building, academic building on the campus of Central Penn College, Pennsylvania, U.S.
 L. V. Stabler Memorial Hospital, Greenville, Alabama
 Stabler Estate, former property of James P. Stabler, now the campus of the University of Maryland, Baltimore County
 Stabler-Leadbeater Apothecary Shop, an historic apothecary shop located in Alexandria, Virginia; now a museum
 Little-Stabler House, a home listed on the National Register of Historic Places in Butler County, Alabama

Other uses 
 "Stabler", a single released by The Prettiots from the 2015 album Funs Cool
 Carter, Stabler and Adams Ltd., original name of Poole Pottery

See also 
 
 Stäbler 
 Stebler